Julia Phillips (1944–2002) was an American film producer.

Julia Phillips may also refer to:

Julia Phillips (author) (born 1989), American author
Julia Phillips (physicist) (born 1954), American physicist